William Blount Rodman Jr. (1889–1976), also known as William B. Rodman, III (as his father was named William B. Rodman II), was a North Carolina lawyer and politician. He served in the North Carolina Senate (1937–1939) and the North Carolina House of Representatives (1950–1955), as North Carolina Attorney General (1955–1956) and as a justice of the North Carolina Supreme Court (1956–1965).

He was the grandson of William B. Rodman, who was also a state Supreme Court justice.

References
Guide to the William Blount Rodman Papers

1889 births
1976 deaths
North Carolina lawyers
Justices of the North Carolina Supreme Court
North Carolina Attorneys General
North Carolina state senators
Members of the North Carolina House of Representatives
20th-century American judges
20th-century American politicians
20th-century American lawyers